John Thomas Folda (born August 8, 1961) is an American prelate of the Roman Catholic Church who has been serving as bishop of the Diocese of Fargo in North Dakota since 2013.

Biography

Early life 
John Thomas Folda was born on August 8, 1961, in Omaha, Nebraska. He graduated from St. Thomas More Elementary School and Archbishop Ryan High School in Omaha and attended the University of Nebraskain Lincoln, Nebraska, earning bachelor and masters degrees.  Folda then attended St. Charles Borromeo Seminary in Wynnewood, Pennsylvania, receiving a Master of Divinity degree.

Priesthood 
Folda was ordained a priest by Bishop Glennon Flavin for the Diocese of Lincoln on May 27, 1989.  He received a Licentiate in Sacred Theology from the Pontifical University of Saint Thomas Aquinas (Angelicum) in Rome in 1993.

After his ordination, Folda served as an assistant pastor at the Cathedral of the Risen Christ Parish and taught religion at St. Pius X High School, both in Lincoln, Nebraska, from 1989 to 1991. From 1993 to 1995, he served as the pastor of St. Paulinus Parish in Syracuse, Nebraska and Holy Trinity Parish in Avoca, Nebraska. At the same time he was a teacher and counselor at Lourdes Central Catholic High School in Nebraska City, Nebraska. 

Beginning in 1995, Folda served as pastor of St. Leo Parish in Palmyra, Nebraska and St. Martin Parish in Douglas, Nebraska. Folda was named the diocesan director of religious education and co-vicar for religious in 1997. The following year, he was named the spiritual director at St. Gregory the Great Seminary in Seward, Nebraska, and rector in 1998.  Pope Benedict XVI named Folda a chaplain of his holiness, with the title "monsignor" in 2007.

Bishop of Fargo 
Pope Francis named Folda as bishop of the Diocese of Fargo on April 8, 2013.  He was consecrated on June 19, 2013 at the Cathedral of St. Mary in Fargo, North Dakota.  Archbishop John Nienstedt was the principal consecrator.  Archbishop Samuel Aquila and Bishop James D. Conley were the co-consecrators.

On July 2, 2021, Folda announced that Bishop James Sullivan, a former bishop of Fargo, had been added to a list of clerics with credible accusations of sexual abuse of minors.  Sullivan, who died in 2006, had been accused of abusing two boys in Lansing, Michigan, when he was a priest.  The diocese renamed a middle school named after Sullivan.

See also

 Catholic Church hierarchy
 Catholic Church in the United States
 Historical list of the Catholic bishops of the United States
 List of Catholic bishops of the United States
 Lists of patriarchs, archbishops, and bishops

References

External links 
 Roman Catholic Diocese of Fargo Official Site

Episcopal succession

 

1961 births
Living people
Clergy from Omaha, Nebraska
St. Charles Borromeo Seminary alumni
Pontifical University of Saint Thomas Aquinas alumni
Roman Catholic Diocese of Lincoln
Roman Catholic bishops of Fargo
21st-century Roman Catholic bishops in the United States
Religious leaders from Nebraska
Bishops appointed by Pope Francis